Glycocaulis is a genus of bacteria from the family of Maricaulaceae.

References

Bacteria genera
Caulobacterales